This list contains the distinctions of the various heads of state of Mexico.

Agustín I (1822–1823)

 First head of state of Mexico.
 First Mexican head of state to be overthrown.
 First Mexican head of state to be born in the 18th century.

Guadalupe Victoria (1824–1829)

 First president of Mexico.
 First president born in Durango. 
 First president to finish his presidential term.

Vicente Guerrero (1829)

 First president with significant African ancestry.

Andrés Manuel López Obrador (2018–)

First president born in Tabasco.
First president belonging to MORENA.

References

Presidency
Mexico presidents
Presidency
Mexico